Ahimsa Entertainment is an Indian film production and distribution company based in London, United Kingdom and the subsidiary is located in Chennai, Tamil Nadu. It was established in 2022 by Vithurs and Sudharsan Natesan. Since its establishment, it has produced and distributed several Tamil films.

History
Ahimsa Entertainment is an Indian film distribution and production company headquartered in the United Kingdom. The company has been focusing on bringing Tamil, Telugu, Hindi, Kannada, and Malayalam films catering to a wider audience through their overseas distribution network.

The company has distributed several successful films in overseas markets, including Vijay's Beast and Varisu, Silambarasan's Vendhu Thanindhathu Kaadu, Vijay Sethupathi's Kaathuvaakula Rendu Kaadhal, Pradeep Ranganathan's Love Today, Dhanush's Naane Varuvean, Vikram's Cobra, and Vetrimaaran's Viduthalai Part 1.

Ahimsa Entertainment is venturing into film production with their first project titled Soppana Sundari, starring Aishwarya Rajesh.

Filmography

Productions and Distributions

References

External links
 Official Twitter
 Official Instagram

Film production companies based in Chennai
Film production companies of India
Film production companies of Tamil Nadu
Indian film studios
Tamil cinema
Film distributors of India